Willis Glacier is a valley glacier in the Saint Johns Range of Victoria Land, flowing northeast from Schist Peak along the west side of Mount Harker to Debenham Glacier. Charted by the Victoria University of Wellington Antarctic Expedition (VUWAE), 1959–60, and named by them for I.A.G. Willis, geophysicist with the expedition.

References

Glaciers of Scott Coast